Belalora weirichi is a species of sea snail, a marine gastropod mollusk in the family Mangeliidae.

Description

Distribution
This marine species occurs on the Abyssal Plain, off Antarctica

References

 Engl W. (2008) Oenopota weirichi n. sp., the first bathyal-abyssal Oenopota from the Antarctic (Mollusca, Gastropoda: Turridae). Antarctic Mollusks, Part 10. Club Conchylia Informationen, 39(3-4): 49–53 
 Engl, W. (2012). Shells of Antarctica. Hackenheim: Conchbooks. 402 pp.

External links
 Kantor Y.I., Harasewych M.G. & Puillandre N. (2016). A critical review of Antarctic Conoidea (Neogastropoda). Molluscan Research. 36(3): 153–206

weirichi
Gastropods described in 2008